Kurt Baumann (born 25 May 1945) is a Swiss rower. He competed in the men's coxless four event at the 1972 Summer Olympics.

References

1945 births
Living people
Swiss male rowers
Olympic rowers of Switzerland
Rowers at the 1972 Summer Olympics
Place of birth missing (living people)